Shagou Township (Mandarin: 沙沟乡) is a township in Guinan County, Hainan Tibetan Autonomous Prefecture, Qinghai, China. In 2010, Shagou Township had a total population of 7,786 people: 3,894 males and 3,892 females: 1,927 under 14 years old, 5,370 aged between 15 and 64 and 489 over 65 years old.

References 

Township-level divisions of Qinghai
Hainan Tibetan Autonomous Prefecture